Geneva Group may refer to:
 Macedonian Secret Revolutionary Committee, also called the Geneva group
 The Geneva Group (United Nations)